Modestobacter is a Gram-positive genus of bacteria from the phylum Actinomycetota.

References

Actinomycetia
Bacteria genera